Nagadevatha temple is a Hindu temple located in the city of Devanhalli, in the state of Karnataka, India. It is the ancestral temple of a Devanahalli family. The temple is close to 400 years old and has been recently renovated.

See also 
 Hindu temple architecture
 Hindu temple

External links 
 

Hindu temples in Bangalore Rural district